The First Japan Arena Tour is the first Japanese concert tour by South Korean girl group Girls' Generation to promote their 2011 self-titled album in Japanese.

History
It was announced on March 7, 2011, that Girls' Generation would embark on their first nationwide Japan tour on May 18, 2011, at Yoyogi National Stadium in Tokyo, with a total of seven stops in Tokyo, Nagoya, Osaka and Fukuoka. The start of the tour was postponed to May 31, 2011, because of the 2011 Tōhoku earthquake and tsunami. Due to overwhelming demand with up to 300,000 applicants applying for tickets, additional stops were added to the tour.

The tour covered Osaka, Saitama, Tokyo, Hiroshima, Nagoya, and Fukuoka with total of fourteen performances. The tour attracted about 140,000 fans.

Media coverage
Various Japanese media, including Mezamashi TV, covered the start of their concert with detailed reports. NHK's Music Japan presented a Girls' Generation special, detailing their meteoric rise in Korea and subsequent debut in Japan, with an interview session interspersed with footage from the Osaka stop of the First Japan Arena Tour. Girls' Generation First Japan Arena Tour in 3D was broadcast on Japan's SkyPerfectTv on August 21.

Set list

Main set

 "Genie (Japanese ver.)"
 "You-aholic"
 "Mr. Taxi"
 "I'm In Love With The Hero"
 "Let It Rain"
 "Snowy Wish"
 "Etude"
 "Kissing You"
 "Oh! (House ver.)"

 "Almost" (Jessica's solo)
 "Lady Marmalade" (Taeyeon & Tiffany's duet)
 "3" (Sunny's solo)
 "Don't Stop the Music" (Hyoyeon's solo)

 "The Great Escape"
 "Bad Girl"
 "Devil's Cry" (Taeyeon's solo)
 "Run Devil Run (Japanese ver.)"
 "Beautiful Stranger"
 "Hoot (Japanese ver.)"

 "If" (Yuri's solo)
 "4 Minutes (Yoona's solo)
 "Stuff Like That There" (Seohyun's solo)
 "Sway" (Sooyoung's solo)

 "Danny Boy
 "Complete"
 "My Child"

 "Cold Noodles"
 "HaHaHa"
 "Gee (Japanese ver.)"
 "Born To Be A Lady"
Encore
 "Into the New World"
 "Way To Go"
 "It's Fantastic" (Japanese ver.)

Tour dates

DVD

Girls' Generation First Japan Tour is the fifth DVD and Blu-ray release from South Korean girl group Girls' Generation. Following their announcement that Girls' Generation will be releasing their First Japanese photobook titled 'Holiday' on November 30, 2011, they also released a Blu-ray/DVD for their First Japanese Concert Tour on December 14.

History
The DVD contains performances and footage from their first Japan tour, which began on May 31, 2011, and took the girls through six cities in Japan for 14 performances. The Blu-ray/DVD will come in two editions, The 'Limited Edition' which will come with the special footage, photobook and a pin badge set.  The Blu-ray and DVD copies will both have the special footage but the 36-paged photobook will differ.  The limited edition will also come with Special caramel box, Digipak for the disk case, and a special cosmetic case holding the ten pin badges (Blu-ray: Gold color / DVD: Silver color).

Track list

Chart performance
Girls’ Generation's ‘Japan First Arena Tour Girls’ Generation’ which was released on December 14 took the no.1 spot on December 14's Oricon Daily DVD Combined Chart, Blu-ray Chart and DVD Music Chart. According to the Oricon Charts, the DVD version of the “Japan First Tour” has placed first for the week of December 12 through the 18th in both the “Music DVD” category and in total DVDs sold. Since its release on December 14, the DVD of Girls’ Generation's successful concert tour in Japan has sold 69,000 copies.
The Blu-ray version of the “Japan First Tour” placed first for the “Music Blu-ray” category and second in total Blu-ray sales for the week. The Blu-ray, released at the same as the DVD, has to date sold 37,000 copies. Girls’ Generation is the only foreign artist to place first on the Oricon Weekly Charts for both the “Music DVD” and “Blu-ray DVD” categories at the same time.

Charts

Sales and certifications

Release history

References

Girls' Generation concert tours
2011 concert tours
Girls' Generation video albums
SM Entertainment video albums
Concert tours of Japan
2011 in Japanese music